Yorkton—Melville is a federal electoral district in Saskatchewan, Canada, that has been represented in the House of Commons of Canada since 1968.

Geography

The district is in east-central Saskatchewan.

History
The electoral district was created in 1966 from Yorkton, Melville and Mackenzie ridings.

In 2006, 30.2% of the population of the Yorkton—Melville constituency were of Ukrainian ethnic origin, the highest such percentage in Canada. Also during the 2006 election, the Yorkton—Melville riding had the highest percentage of eligible voters over the age of 65, and highest average age of all the then-308 federal electoral districts.

This riding lost a fraction of territory to Regina—Qu'Appelle and gained territory from Saskatoon—Humboldt and a fraction from Desnethé—Missinippi—Churchill River during the 2012 electoral redistribution.

Members of Parliament

Election results

See also
 List of Canadian federal electoral districts
 Past Canadian electoral districts

References

 
 Expenditures - 2008
 Expenditures - 2004
 Expenditures - 2000
 Expenditures - 1997

Notes

Saskatchewan federal electoral districts
Canora, Saskatchewan
Melville, Saskatchewan
Rama, Saskatchewan
Yorkton